Pinus stylesii is a species of pine in the family Pinaceae, native to the northern Sierra Madre Oriental mountains of northeastern Mexico. A tree reaching , it is a member of [[Pinus subsection Strobus|Pinus subsection Strobus]]. It was split off from Pinus strobiformis'', which is found in the Sierra Madre Occidental.

References

stylesii
Endemic flora of Mexico
Flora of Northeastern Mexico
Plants described in 2008